Armored is a 2009 American heist action thriller film directed by Nimród Antal, written by James V. Simpson, and starring Matt Dillon, Jean Reno, Laurence Fishburne, Amaury Nolasco, Milo Ventimiglia, Skeet Ulrich, and Columbus Short. It was released on December 4, 2009.

Plot
Ty Hackett (Columbus Short), a former armed service veteran is a member of Eagle Shield security in one of their many armored transportation teams. He is the legal guardian of younger brother Jimmy (Andre Kinney) after the death of their parents. He is receiving constant letters about impending foreclosure on his home and the state is considering the placement of Jimmy in a foster home, due to his truancy and Ty's inability to adequately care for him. Ty is approached by Mike Cochrane (Matt Dillon), his godfather and co-worker, and informed of Mike's plan to steal money ($42 million) being transferred from the Federal Reserve System to the local banks. Ty turns down the offer to participate in the crime.

The following morning, after receiving assurances from Mike that no one will be hurt, Ty reluctantly agrees to participate. The six-person crew offloads the first truck at an abandoned steel mill, but their plan is compromised when a homeless man living in the mill is spotted observing them. Baines (Laurence Fishburne) shoots the potential witness. Upset over this, Ty barricades himself inside the truck with the remaining $21 million inside. After an attempt to flee in the truck fails, Ty sets off the truck's alarm. The alarm catches the attention of Jake Eckehart (Milo Ventimiglia), a local sheriff's deputy.

The remaining thieves plan to break into the truck by knocking the pins out of the door hinges. Jake arrives when Ty successfully restores power to the truck's alarm. Baines shoots Jake. While the thieves are distracted, Ty sneaks Jake into the truck. Dobbs (Skeet Ulrich) begins to have second thoughts about the operation and agrees with Ty to get the fuse Mike removed from the engine. Dobbs is caught trying to put it back and Palmer stabs him to death.

As the thieves continue to remove the door hinges, Ty covers the interior windows with the remainder of the $21 million and takes Jake's radio to the roof in an attempt to contact the authorities. He is caught by Palmer, but Ty is able to convince Palmer that what they are doing is not right. Palmer consequently commits suicide. The remaining thieves reveal their possession of a kidnapped Jimmy. Ty complies with their demands, before Quinn (Jean Reno) and Baines head for the money. The two men are killed by a booby trap rigged in the money case.

Mike chases after Ty in the working armored truck and crashes into a pit, the accident being fatal for him. Later, as Jake is recovering in the hospital, Ashcroft tells Ty that Jake spoke of his efforts to stop the thieves. There is talk of giving Ty a reward. With Jimmy also being released from the hospital, Ty and Jimmy go home.

Cast
 Columbus Short as Tyler "Ty" Hackett
 Matt Dillon as Mickey "Mike" Cochrane
 Laurence Fishburne as Baines
 Jean Reno as Quinn
 Skeet Ulrich as Dobbs
 Amaury Nolasco as Palmer
 Milo Ventimiglia as Officer Jake Eckehart
 Fred Ward as Duncan Ashcroft
 Andre Kinney as Jimmy Hackett

Production
In October 2006, it was announced Screen Gems had acquired a spec script titled Armored. In October 2007, it was announced Matt Dillon and Columbus Short would topline the film.

Filming took place in Los Angeles.

Reception
The film was not screened in advance to critics. The film received mostly negative reviews, getting a 40% rating on Rotten Tomatoes based on 55 critics surveyed. The site's consensus reads: "This B-grade thriller has a good cast and director but is undone by plot holes and messy conclusion".

A. O. Scott, in a New York Times review, wrote that the Hungarian director, Nimród Antal, "has an old-fashioned, functional style. […] He has made an unabashed B movie: basic, brutal and sometimes clumsy, but far from dumb, and not bad at all". The film doesn't minimize the seriousness of killing and conveys a bleak outlook on economic blight "with quiet passion and conviction", Scott wrote. The cinematography of Andrzej Sekuła (whose work also appears in Reservoir Dogs and Pulp Fiction) helps capture that mood, according to Scott.

The film was accidentally released by Sony on PlayStation Network free of charge, though it was pulled after an unspecified amount of time. The movie was issued while it was still showing in theaters, and although the mistake was eventually spotted, it is thought to have been downloaded thousands of times before the error was fixed.

Home media 
This movie was released as Armored on DVD Region 1 Anamorphic widescreen and Blu-ray Disc Region A formats on March 16, 2010.

References

External links
 
 
 
 
 

2009 films
2009 action thriller films
2009 crime thriller films
American action thriller films
American crime thriller films
American heist films
Films scored by John Murphy (composer)
Films directed by Nimród Antal
Films set in Los Angeles
Films shot in Los Angeles
Screen Gems films
2000s English-language films
2000s American films